TSOL is the third studio album by Canadian rapper Shad. It was released in Canada on May 25, 2010 and in the United States on October 5, 2010. It is his second album released on Black Box Recordings, and his first album of new material since 2007's Polaris Music Prize-nominated The Old Prince.

The first single, "Yaa I Get It", was released in April 2010. A music video was released on April 20.

The album was a shortlisted nominee for the 2010 Polaris Music Prize, and won the Juno Award for Rap Recording of the Year at the 2011 Juno Awards.

Tour
The album was supported with a cross-Canada tour, featuring opening acts Grand Analog in Western Canada and D-Sisive in Ontario.

Critical reception

At Metacritic, which assigns a weighted average score out of 100 to reviews from mainstream critics, the album received an average score of 81, based on 10 reviews, indicating "universal acclaim".

The album was ranked number two in Exclaim!s 2010 hip-hop rankings, with the magazine writing that Shad is "the rare MC who conveys wisdom without being preachy. More than anything, he's versatile, able to seamlessly switch from fierce, hilarious battle raps on "Yaa I Get It" to heartfelt reflection over the contemplative piano and guitars of "At the Same Time" without seeming contradictory." Complex named TSOL the 14th best Canadian album of the 2010s.

Track listing

Charts

References

External links
 

2010 albums
Shad (rapper) albums
Decon albums
Juno Award for Rap Recording of the Year recordings